Central Vermont Medical Center (CVMC) is the primary health care provider for 66,000 people in central Vermont.

The medical staff numbers 121 physicians including nine community-based medical group practices. CVMC provide 24-hour emergency care, with 122 inpatient beds. CVMC is accredited by the Joint Commission on Accreditation of Healthcare Organizations. CVMC includes Woodridge Nursing Home.

History

In 1895, Homer W. Heaton founded Heaton Hospital in Montpelier, Vermont. In the neighboring city of Barre, Frank E. Langley and community leaders built Barre City Hospital in 1907.

In 1961, the Vermont State Health Commission recommended that the two hospitals merge to eliminate duplication of services but continue providing health care to Washington County, Vermont. The medical staff of Mayo Memorial Hospital, a small 29-bed osteopathic hospital located 15 miles to the south, also voted to join in the merger. In 1968, Central Vermont Hospital was constructed in Berlin, Vermont, between the two cities.

Now known as Central Vermont Medical Center, CVMC is affiliated with the University of Vermont Health Network, though it maintains an independent Board of Trustees.

References

External links
Central Vermont Medical Center web site

Hospital buildings completed in 1968
Hospitals in Vermont
Buildings and structures in Berlin, Vermont
1968 establishments in Vermont